In the Buginese language, pallawa is a punctuation symbol. It is composed of three cascading diagonal dots. A pallawa is used to separate rhythmico-intonational groups, thus functionally corresponding to the full stop and comma of the Latin script.

See also
 Lontara script

References

External links
 Pallawa standards proposal

Punctuation